= Magdalene Schoch =

Maria Magdalene Schoch (February 15, 1897, Würzburg - November 6, 1987, Falls Church, Fairfax, Virginia) was a German lawyer and in 1932 the first woman in Germany to habilitate in the law. In 1937, she emigrated to the United States for political reasons, where she continued her work. She earned her doctor of laws in 1920 from the University of Würzburg, her thesis being "English War Legislation Against Enemy Corporations" and thereafter became a research assistant to Albert Mendelssohn-Bartholdy.
